
The following is a list of Playboy Playmates of 1965.  Playboy magazine names their Playmate of the Month each month throughout the year.

January

Sally Duberson (born October 23, 1942) is an American model. She was Playboy magazine's Playmate of the Month for the January 1965 issue. Her centerfold was photographed by Pompeo Posar.

February

Jessica St. George (born October 13, 1946) was Playboy magazine's Playmate of the Month for the February 1965 issue. Her centerfold was photographed by Mario Casilli. St. George was the first Greek American to become a Playmate.

March

Jennifer Jackson (born February 6, 1945) is an American model who was chosen as Playboy magazine's Playmate of the month for its March 1965 issue. She was the first Black Playmate of the Month, and she was photographed by Pompeo Posar.

April

Sue Williams (born May 13, 1945) is an American actress and Playboy magazine's Playmate of the Month for April 1965.  Her centerfold was photographed by Ed DeLong and William V. Figge.

May

Maria McBane (born 8 February 1946) is a French American model and actress who was Playboy magazine's Playmate of the Month for its May 1965 issue. Her centerfold was photographed by Ed DeLong and William Figge.

June

Hedy Scott (born 24 January 1946) is a Belgian-American model and actress who was Playboy magazine's Playmate of the Month for its June 1965 issue. Her centerfold was photographed by Ron Vogel. She went on to have a brief acting career, appearing in Fireball 500 (1966) and an episode of The Munsters.

July

Gay Collier (born October 9, 1942) is an American model and actress who was Playboy magazine's Playmate of the Month for its July 1965 issue. Her centerfold was photographed by Mario Casilli.

August

Lannie Balcom (born Linda K. Balcom; March 17, 1941 –  April 25, 1991) was an American model and actress. She was Playboy magazine's Playmate of the Month for its August 1965 issue. Her centerfold was photographed by J. Barry O'Rourke. She was also a Playboy Bunny at the Chicago club.

Balcom died on April 25, 1991, at the age of 50.

September

Patti Reynolds (born May 28, 1948) is an American model and actress who was Playboy magazine's Playmate of the Month for its September 1965 issue. Her centerfold was photographed by Stan Malinowski.

October

Allison Parks (born Gloria Sharlene Waldron; October 18, 1943 – June 21, 2010) was an American model and actress who was Playboy magazine's Playmate of the Month for October, 1965 and Playmate of the Year for 1966.  Her original pictorial was photographed by William Figge.

November

Pat Russo (born October 5, 1941) is an American model who was Playboy magazine's Playmate of the Month for its November 1965 issue. Her centerfold was photographed by Pompeo Posar.

December

Dinah Willis (born August 5, 1945) is an American model who was Playboy magazine's Playmate of the Month for its December 1965 issue. Her centerfold was photographed by Pompeo Posar. She was also on the cover of the 1966 Playboy calendar.

See also
 List of people in Playboy 1960–1969

References

1965-related lists
1965
Playmates Of 1965